Tukums II Station is a railway station in Tukums, Latvia on the Ventspils I – Tukums II, Tukums II – Jelgava and Torņakalns – Tukums II railways.

References

External links

Railway stations in Latvia
Railway stations in the Russian Empire opened in 1904
Tukums
Courland